Hans Gram may refer to:

 Hans Christian Gram (1853–1938), Danish scientist who invented Gram staining
 Hans Gram (composer) (1754-1804), Danish-American composer and musician
 Hans Gram (historian) (1685–1748), Danish academic

See also
 Hans Gram Holst (1744–1815), Danish-Norwegian army officer